Alphonse Case "Phonney" Martin (August 4, 1845 – May 24, 1933) was an American Major League Baseball right fielder and pitcher who played two seasons in the National Association from  to .

Career
Martin, born in New York City, was an American Civil War veteran who played in organized baseball as far back as 1869, when he pitched for the Brooklyn Eckfords. That year, a reporter for the New York Clipper described him as an "extremely hard pitcher to hit for the ball never comes in a straight line‚ but in a tantalizing curve." If the observation is true, this would pre-date Candy Cummings, the pitcher given credit as the inventor of the curveball. His pitching style led to his nickname of "Old Slow Ball".

Martin officially began his professional baseball career when he joined the  Troy Haymakers of the National Association as a pitcher and right fielder, playing in 25 games, pitching in eight of those games. Later in the season, he returned to the Eckfords, now also in the Association, and played in the same pitcher/outfielder role for 18 games. That year, he is given credit for managing the Eckfords for nine games, with a record of 1 win and 8 losses. There is some dispute about this, as SABR and retrosheet.org list Andy Allison, Jimmy Wood, and Martin as managing the team that year, while baseball-reference.com lists Jim Clinton and Wood as the managers. For the  season, he joined the New York Mutuals, which turned out to be his last season at this level. He played 30 games in right field, and pitched six games.

Death
Martin died in Hollis, New York at the age of 87, and is interred at Cypress Hills National Cemetery in Brooklyn, New York.

References

External links

Major League Baseball pitchers
Major League Baseball right fielders
New York Mutuals (NABBP) players
Brooklyn Eckfords (NABBP) players
Troy Haymakers players
Brooklyn Eckfords players
Brooklyn Eckfords managers
New York Mutuals players
Baseball player-managers
Baseball players from New York City
Burials at Cypress Hills Cemetery
1845 births
1933 deaths
19th-century baseball players